Oscar D'Agostino (29 August 1901 – 16 March 1975) was an Italian chemist and one of the so-called Via Panisperna boys, the group of young scientists led by Enrico Fermi: all of them were physicists, except for D'Agostino, who was a chemist.

In 1934 he contributed to Fermi's experiment (that gave Fermi the possibility to win the Nobel Prize in 1938) to showing the properties of slow neutrons. 
That led the way to the discovery of nuclear fission, and later on to the construction of the first atomic bomb.

Bibliography
 O. D'Agostino: Il chimico dei fantasmi. Mephite, 2002

See also 
Radioactive decay
Nuclear chain reaction
Slow neutron
Via Panisperna boys
Enrico Fermi

External links 
 Enrico Fermi and the Via Panisperna Boys from the Museum of Physics of "La Sapienza" University in Rome
  Il chimico dei fantasmi

1901 births
1975 deaths
People from the Province of Avellino
Italian chemists
National Research Council (Italy) people